Carma - The Movie is a Pakistani film directed by Kashan Admani and written by Fawad Hai. Carma is co-produced by Kashan Admani and Fawad Hai. The movie stars Adnan Siddiqui, Zhalay Sarhadi, Naveen Waqar, and Osama Tahir in lead roles. The film is inspired by the works of Quentin Tarantino. The movie was released on 2 September 2022, after being premiered for the media and film fraternity on 1 September 2022.

Plot 
A man is kidnapped and held hostage in his car by 3 members of a dangerous gang, led by the vicious psychopath Sasha, played by Zhalay Sarhadi. But what appears to be a straightforward kidnapping turns out to be an intricate tale of deception, vengeance and retribution. Each progressive scene during the kidnapping is linked with an impactful scene from the past, producing a cohesive story that ends with a series of twists. Carma's screenplay covers 50 scenes shot entirely in and around cars. The movie's name is a combination of Karma and cars.

The trailer of the movie was launched in an event in Karachi that was attended by the entire cast of the movie and the media. The inspiration of the film is drawn by the works of acclaimed Hollywood director Quentin Tarantino and is based on themes of revenge, murder and betrayal.

Cast 

 Adnan Siddiqui as Ali Khan
 Zhalay Sarhadi as Sasha
 Naveen Waqar as Maria Shah and Hamza/Haroon's wife
 Osama Tahir as Hamza/Haroon 
 Paras Masroor as Hashmat 
 Arjumand Rahim 
 Umer Aalam as Jamal
 Vajdaan Shah as Abdul 
 Khaled Anam as Shah
 Lili Caseley as Lili

Production 
The film was shot in Karachi and London. Production was completed in Kashan Admani's production facility, Dream Station Productions.

Soundtracks 
The music of the movie is composed by Kashan Admani, who is also the director and producer of the film. The lyrics have been penned down by Lili Caseley, and Kashan Admani.

The movie features several songs. Khamoshiyan sung by Asad Rasheed of Mizmaar, Banda sung by Chand Tara Orchestra, It's You by Lili Caseley. The theme song of the movie was composed by Kashan Admani himself. The movie also features Tere Rung, performed by the lead singer of the band Fuzön, Charkha sung by Mahnoor, and Ek Parinda by Asad Rasheed.

Projection

Critical reception 
Carma received mostly positive reviews from critics. Express Tribune rates the film 9 out of 10 and wrote "Kashan Admani's ‘Tarentino-inspired’ film was a herculean undertaking and it shows". Something Haute terms Carma as a groundbreaking movie that is shot in and around cars. Dawn has served mixed reviews about the movie writes, "Carma is an engaging thriller where we see bad things happen to very bad people. When you think about this in karmic context, there is some fun in seeing bad people get what they deserve." The movie has a rating of 8.3 on IMDb.

References

External links 
 
 Carma - The Movie on Instagram
 Carma - The Movie on Facebook

Pakistani crime films
Pakistani thriller films
English-language Pakistani films
2022 films
2020s Urdu-language films
Urdu-language Pakistani films